Princes Dock may refer to:
Prince's Dock, Liverpool, England
Princes Dock railway station
1 Princes Dock a residential complex in Liverpool
Prince's Half-Tide Dock in Liverpool, England

See also
Prince's Dock (formerly known as Junction Dock) in Kingston upon Hull, England
Glasgow Science Centre / Pacific Quay, located on the site of Prince's Dock, Glasgow (also the site for the Glasgow Garden Festival)